Jukka Vastaranta (born 29 March 1984) is a Finnish professional cyclist from Tampere. From 2003 to 2006 he rode for the Dutch team  but in 2007 he switched to the Belgian continental team . In 2008 he rode for the mountain bike team Brink-Ten Tusscher, but after a good start had to retire again due to prolonged health problems.

After settling back to Finland, in late 2008 he finally found some help for the health problems he had suffered from past several seasons. In 2009, he significantly got better and won all Finnish mountain bike races that he took part in and finished 36th in MTB Marathon World Championships.

He finished 4th in MTB Marathon European Championships and took some important victories in Europe. In July, the first MTB XC Olympic Champion Bart Brentjens contacted Jukka to join his professional team, Trek-Brentjens MTB Racing Team.

Major results

Road

1999
 2nd  Criterium, European Youth Olympic Festival
2001
 1st  Overall Tour de l'Abitibi
1st Stages 3 & 5
 1st  Overall GP Général Patton
1st Stage 1
 1st  Overall La Coupe du Président de la Ville de Grudziądz
1st Stages 3 & 5
 8th Road race, UCI Junior Road World Championships
2002
 1st  Overall GP Général Patton
1st Stage 1
 1st  Overall Trophée Centre Morbihan
1st Stages 1 & 2
 1st Remouchamps–Ferrières–Remouchamps
 UCI Junior Road World Championships
2nd  Time trial
7th Road race
 2nd Overall Keizer der Juniores
 3rd Overall UCI Juniors World Cup
2003
 1st  Overall Triptyque Ardennais
1st Stages 1 & 3
 1st Flèche Ardennaise
 1st Brussels–Opwijk
 1st Stage 2 Tour des Pyrénées
 2nd Overall Volta a Lleida
1st Stages 3 & 5
 5th Vlaamse Pijl
 5th Time trial, National Road Championships
 7th Rund um Düren
 8th Road race, European Under-23 Road Championships
 8th Overall Ruban Granitier Breton
2004
 1st  Time trial, National Road Championships
 1st Stage 3 Olympia's Tour
 2nd Overall Circuit des Mines
1st Stage 3
 4th La Côte Picarde
 4th Grand Prix de la Ville de Lillers
 6th Overall Paris–Corrèze
2005
 1st Stage 3 Ster Elektrotoer
 3rd Overall Tour de Luxembourg
 9th Overall UNIQA Classic
 9th Scheldeprijs
2007
 8th Overall Étoile de Bessèges

Mountain
 UCI Mountain Bike World Championships
 8th, Marathon (2011)
 27th, Cross Country (2010)

 UCI Mountain Bike European Championships
 2nd, Marathon (2011)
 4th, Marathon (2010)
 1st, Cross Country Juniors (2001)

 UCI Mountain Bike Finnish Championships
 1st, Cross Country (2011, 2010, 2009, 2001)
 1st, Marathon (2010, 2009)

 UCI Road Bike World Cup
 1st overall, Juniors (2001)

 UCI Road Bike World Championships
 2nd, Juniors (2002)

 UCI Road Bike Finnish Championships
 1st, TT (2004)

 Miscellaneous
 1st in KitzAlpBike XCO (2011)
 3rd in Dolomiti Superbike (2011)
 1st overall in Zillertal Bike Challenge (2010)
 Winner of the 2nd event of Spanish MTB Marathon Cup (2010)
 Stage winner in Ster Electro tour (2005)
 Second in Tour of Luxemburg (2005)

References

1984 births
Living people
Finnish male cyclists
Sportspeople from Tampere
Cyclists at the 2015 European Games
European Games competitors for Finland
Finnish mountain bikers
20th-century Finnish people
21st-century Finnish people